The 1999–2000 NBA season was the 32nd season for the National Basketball Association's Phoenix Suns. The Suns acquired the ninth pick in the 1999 NBA draft from the Dallas Mavericks, and selected Shawn Marion out of UNLV, During the off-season, the team acquired All-Star guard Penny Hardaway from the Orlando Magic, signed free agent Rodney Rogers, and re-signed former Suns center Oliver Miller, who played for the team when they reached the 1993 NBA Finals. Scott Skiles would come on as head coach, replacing Danny Ainge after a 13–7 start to the season. The Suns posted a 7-game winning streak between November and December, then won eight straight games in February, and held a 29–19 record at the All-Star break. The Suns finished third in the Pacific Division with a 53–29 record, and extend the franchise's record for playoff appearances before losing in the Western Conference Semi-finals.

Six players on the team averaged double-digits in points this season; Clifford Robinson led the team in scoring with 18.5 points per game, while Hardaway averaged 16.9 points, 5.8 rebounds, 5.3 assists and 1.6 steals per game in only 60 games due to a foot injury, and Kidd provided the team with 14.3 points, 7.2 rebounds, 10.1 assists and 2.0 steals per game, and was selected for the 2000 NBA All-Star Game. In addition, Rogers played a sixth man role, averaging 13.8 points and 5.5 rebounds per game off the bench, finished the regular season fourth in three-point field goal percentage at .439, and won the NBA Sixth Man of the Year Award. Tom Gugliotta contributed 13.7 points, 7.9 rebounds and 1.5 steals per game, but only played 54 games due to injury, and did not play in any of the Suns' playoff games, while Marion averaged 10.2 points and 6.5 rebounds per game in only 51 games. On the defensive side, Luc Longley averaged 6.3 points and 4.5 rebounds per game, and Miller provided with 6.3 points, 5.1 rebounds and 1.6 blocks per game in only 51 games. Kidd would earn All-NBA First Team honors, and he and Robinson were both named to the NBA All-Defensive Second Team, and Marion and was named to the NBA All-Rookie Second Team. In March, Kidd suffered an ankle injury and missed the final month of the regular season. Former Suns guard Kevin Johnson would come out of his retirement, averaging 6.7 points and 4.0 assists per game in six games.

The Suns finished with the same regular season record, but did not have home court advantage going into their Western Conference First Round match-up with the defending champion San Antonio Spurs. Still, the Suns would advance to their first conference semifinals appearance since the 1994–95 season en route to taking the series three games to one. The Suns lost in the conference semi-finals to new league MVP Shaquille O'Neal, Kobe Bryant and the eventual champion Los Angeles Lakers four games to one. The Lakers would reach the NBA Finals to defeat the Indiana Pacers in six games.

Following the season, Johnson retired for the second and last time, while Rex Chapman also retired due to continuing injuries, Miller was released to free agency, and Longley was traded to the New York Knicks.

Offseason

NBA Draft

The Suns received the ninth pick from a trade with the Dallas Mavericks in 1998. With the pick they selected combo forward Shawn Marion from UNLV. Marion averaged 18.7 points, 9.3 rebounds, 2.5 steals and 1.9 blocks per game in one year with the Runnin' Rebels. On July 30, the Suns signed him to a 4-year rookie contract for $5.9 million. Though missing two months with a knee injury, Marion averaged 10.2 points and 6.5 rebounds per game in his first season, and was named to the NBA All-Rookie Second Team. Marion would play over eight seasons with the Suns, becoming an All-Star four times and being named to the All-NBA Third Team twice, before being traded to the Miami Heat in 2008.

The Suns traded their first-round pick to the Chicago Bulls in 1999. With the pick the Bulls selected future All-Star and Defensive Player of the Year Ron Artest (later Metta World Peace). They also traded their second-round pick to the Houston Rockets in 1996. With the pick the Rockets selected Tyrone Washington.

Roster

Regular season

Standings

Record vs. opponents

Game log

Regular season 

|-  align="center" bgcolor="#ffcccc"
| 1 || November 2 || @ Denver || L 102–107 (OT) || Tom Gugliotta (22) || Tom Gugliotta (19)|| Jason Kidd (8) || Pepsi Center  19,099 || 0–1 || 
|-  align="center" bgcolor="#ccffcc"
| 2 || November 4 || Philadelphia || W 84–80 || Jason Kidd (22) || Tom Gugliotta (10)|| Tied (3) || America West Arena  19,023 || 1–1 || 
|-  align="center" bgcolor="#ccffcc"
| 3 || November 7 || San Antonio || W 77–74 || Jason Kidd (23) || Penny Hardaway (10)|| Jason Kidd (7) || America West Arena  19,023 || 2–1 || 
|-  align="center" bgcolor="#ccffcc"
| 4 || November 9 || @ Chicago || W 103–80 || Tied (19) || Tom Gugliotta (12)|| Jason Kidd (9) || United Center  22,026 || 3–1 || 
|-  align="center" bgcolor="#ccffcc"
| 5 || November 10 || @ New Jersey || W 104–89 || Penny Hardaway (25) || Oliver Miller (10)|| Penny Hardaway (5) || Continental Airlines Arena  11,652 || 4–1 || 
|-  align="center" bgcolor="#ffcccc"
| 6 || November 12 || @ Milwaukee || L 92–107 || Penny Hardaway (19) || Tom Gugliotta (10)|| Tied (4) || Bradley Center  16,137 || 4–2 || 
|-  align="center" bgcolor="#ffcccc"
| 7 || November 13 || @ Minnesota || L 100–111 || Penny Hardaway (21) || Oliver Miller (8)|| Jason Kidd (7) || Target Center  20,003 || 4–3 || 
|-  align="center" bgcolor="#ffcccc"
| 8 || November 15 || L.A. Lakers || L 82–91 || Jason Kidd (20) || Luc Longley (10)|| Jason Kidd (10) || America West Arena  19,023 || 4–4 || 
|-  align="center" bgcolor="#ccffcc"
| 9 || November 17 || Chicago || W 105–81 || Tied (18) || Tom Gugliotta (7)|| Jason Kidd (11) || America West Arena  18,480 || 5–4 || 
|-  align="center" bgcolor="#ccffcc"
| 10 || November 19 || New York || W 96–81 || Todd Day (20) || Tom Gugliotta (9)|| Jason Kidd (10) || America West Arena  19,023 || 6–4 || 
|-  align="center" bgcolor="#ccffcc"
| 11 || November 21 || Seattle || W 99–86 || Jason Kidd (25) || Clifford Robinson (8)|| Jason Kidd (14) || America West Arena  18,663 || 7–4 || 
|-  align="center" bgcolor="#ccffcc"
| 12 || November 23 || Toronto || W 94–93 || Penny Hardaway (17) || Tied (7)|| Jason Kidd (15) || America West Arena  18,718 || 8–4 || 
|-  align="center" bgcolor="#ccffcc"
| 13 || November 27 || New Jersey || W 129–90 || Shawn Marion (27) || Tied (8)|| Tied (7) || America West Arena  19,023 || 9–4 || 
|-  align="center" bgcolor="#ccffcc"
| 14 || November 30 || @ L.A. Clippers || W 94–80 || Jason Kidd (20) || Tom Gugliotta (11)|| Jason Kidd (10) || Staples Center  10,233 || 10–4 || 
|-

|-  align="center" bgcolor="#ccffcc"
| 15 || December 1 || Houston || W 128–122 (2OT) || Clifford Robinson (25) || Tied (8)|| Jason Kidd (11) || America West Arena  18,630 || 11–4 || 
|-  align="center" bgcolor="#ffcccc"
| 16 || December 4 || @ Houston || L 95–105 || Tied (21) || Penny Hardaway (9)|| Tied (5) || The Summit  16,285 || 11–5 || 
|-  align="center" bgcolor="#ffcccc"
| 17 || December 5 || Portland || L 90–92 || Tied (19) || Luc Longley (9)|| Jason Kidd (11) || America West Arena  19,023 || 11–6 || 
|-  align="center" bgcolor="#ccffcc"
| 18 || December 7 || Orlando || W 110–107 || Jason Kidd (29) || Oliver Miller (8)|| Jason Kidd (10) || America West Arena  18,249 || 12–6 || 
|-  align="center" bgcolor="#ccffcc"
| 19 || December 9 || Washington || W 99–85 || Clifford Robinson (31) || Tom Gugliotta (8)|| Jason Kidd (9) || America West Arena  18,053 || 13–6 || 
|-  align="center" bgcolor="#ffcccc"
| 20 || December 11 || @ Dallas || L 115–120 || Clifford Robinson (28) || Jason Kidd (13)|| Jason Kidd (9) || Reunion Arena  14,444 || 13–7 || 
|-  align="center" bgcolor="#ccffcc"
| 21 || December 14 || Detroit || W 114–104 || Rex Chapman (22) || Jason Kidd (9)|| Jason Kidd (11) || America West Arena  18,575 || 14–7 || 
|-  align="center" bgcolor="#ccffcc"
| 22 || December 17 || @ Portland || W 110–102 || Jason Kidd (32) || Tom Gugliotta (14)|| Jason Kidd (10) || Rose Garden Arena  20,584 || 15–7 || 
|-  align="center" bgcolor="#ccffcc"
| 23 || December 18 || Sacramento || W 119–103 || Clifford Robinson (33) || Jason Kidd (14)|| Jason Kidd (14) || America West Arena  19,023 || 16–7 || 
|-  align="center" bgcolor="#ccffcc"
| 24 || December 20 || Milwaukee || W 108–101 || Rodney Rogers (24) || Rodney Rogers (13)|| Jason Kidd (11) || America West Arena  18,656 || 17–7 || 
|-  align="center" bgcolor="#ffcccc"
| 25 || December 21 || @ San Antonio || L 90–91 (OT) || Clifford Robinson (26) || Oliver Miller (12)|| Jason Kidd (10) || Alamodome  23,480 || 17–8 || 
|-  align="center" bgcolor="#ffcccc"
| 26 || December 23 || Dallas || L 111–110 || Clifford Robinson (30) || Clifford Robinson (9)|| Jason Kidd (15) || America West Arena  19,023 || 17–9 || 
|-  align="center" bgcolor="#ccffcc"
| 27 || December 26 || Golden State || W 108–88 || Clifford Robinson (25) || Clifford Robinson (8)|| Jason Kidd (7) || America West Arena  19,023 || 18–9 || 
|-  align="center" bgcolor="#ffcccc"
| 28 || December 27 || @ Utah || L 91–92 || Rex Chapman (29) || Jason Kidd (12)|| Jason Kidd (15) || Delta Center  19,911 || 18–10 || 
|-  align="center" bgcolor="#ffcccc"
| 29 || December 29 || @ L.A. Lakers || L 103–87 || Clifford Robinson (24) || Clifford Robinson (8)|| Jason Kidd (11) || Staples Center  19,911 || 18–11 || 
|-

|-  align="center" bgcolor="#ccffcc"
| 30 || January 4 || Charlotte || W 86–80 || Clifford Robinson (30) || Tom Gugliotta (10)|| Jason Kidd (10) || America West Arena  18,640 || 19–11 || 
|-  align="center" bgcolor="#ffcccc"
| 31 || January 7 || San Antonio || L 83–102 || Clifford Robinson (22) || Luc Longley (10)|| Jason Kidd (13) || America West Arena  19,023 || 19–12 || 
|-  align="center" bgcolor="#ffcccc"
| 32 || January 8 || @ Portland || L 91–96 || Rex Chapman (20) || Tom Gugliotta (9)|| Jason Kidd (14) || Rose Garden Arena  20,584 || 19–13 || 
|-  align="center" bgcolor="#ffcccc"
| 33 || January 11 || @ Seattle || L 88–101 || Clifford Robinson (17) || Tom Gugliotta (9)|| Jason Kidd (15) || KeyArena  13,912 || 19–14 || 
|-  align="center" bgcolor="#ccffcc"
| 34 || January 12 || @ Vancouver || W 95–92 || Jason Kidd (20) || Jason Kidd (10)|| Jason Kidd (10) || General Motors Place  14,404 || 20–14 || 
|-  align="center" bgcolor="#ffcccc"
| 35 || January 14 || Portland || L 105–83 || Clifford Robinson (23) || Rodney Rogers (10)|| Jason Kidd (8) || America West Arena  19,023 || 20–15 || 
|-  align="center" bgcolor="#ccffcc"
| 36 || January 16 || Denver || W 113–100 || Clifford Robinson (50) || Tied (8)|| Jason Kidd (13) || America West Arena  19,023 || 21–15 || 
|-  align="center" bgcolor="#ccffcc"
| 37 || January 21 || @ Denver || W 101–99 || Tied (24) || Tom Gugliotta (15) || Jason Kidd (12) || Pepsi Center  18,221 || 22–15 || 
|-  align="center" bgcolor="#ccffcc"
| 38 || January 22 || Cleveland || W 101–88 || Tied (16) || Tom Gugliotta (9) || Jason Kidd (12) || America West Arena  19,023 || 23–15 || 
|-  align="center" bgcolor="#ffcccc"
| 39 || January 25 || @ Indiana || L 87–93 || Clifford Robinson (24) || Tom Gugliotta (10) || Jason Kidd (8) || Conseco Fieldhouse  18,345 || 23–16 || 
|-  align="center" bgcolor="#ccffcc"
| 40 || January 26 || @ Philadelphia || W 93–87 || Penny Hardaway (27) || Jason Kidd (13) || Jason Kidd (8) || First Union Center  19,450 || 24–16 || 
|-  align="center" bgcolor="#ffcccc"
| 41 || January 28 || @ Boston || L 88–91 || Clifford Robinson (37) || Jason Kidd (12) || Jason Kidd (14) || Fleet Center  18,624 || 24–17 || 
|-  align="center" bgcolor="#ffcccc"
| 42 || January 29 || @ Charlotte || L 100–79 || Penny Hardaway (24) || Tom Gugliotta (11) || Jason Kidd (6) || Charlotte Coliseum  19,366 || 24–18 || 
|-  align="center" bgcolor="#ccffcc"
| 43 || January 31 || @ Orlando || W 117–113 || Clifford Robinson (28) || Tied (8) || Jason Kidd (14) || Orlando Arena  13,677 || 25–18 || 
|-

|-  align="center" bgcolor="#ccffcc"
| 44 || February 2 || L.A. Clippers || W 114–68 || Clifford Robinson (21) || Luc Longley (9) || Jason Kidd (8) || America West Arena  18,421 || 26–18 || 
|-  align="center" bgcolor="#ffcccc"
| 45 || February 4 || @ Seattle || L 86–94 || Rodney Rogers (26) || Jason Kidd (12) || Jason Kidd (6) || KeyArena  15,739 || 26–19 || 
|-  align="center" bgcolor="#ccffcc"
| 46 || February 6 || Seattle || W 105–93 || Tied (22) || Tom Gugliotta (9) || Jason Kidd (12) || America West Arena  19,023 || 27–19 || 
|-  align="center" bgcolor="#ccffcc"
| 47 || February 8 || Vancouver || W 94–76 || Luc Longley (20) || Penny Hardaway (8) || Jason Kidd (9) || America West Arena  18,385 || 28–19 || 
|-  align="center" bgcolor="#ccffcc"
| 48 || February 10 || Minnesota || W 101–85 || Tied (16) || Luc Longley (12) || Jason Kidd (7) || America West Arena  19,023 || 29–19 || 
|-  align="center" bgcolor="#ccffcc"
| 49 || February 15 || @ Sacramento || W 117–108 || Rodney Rogers (36) || Jason Kidd (10) || Jason Kidd (11) || ARCO Arena  17,317 || 30–19 || 
|-  align="center" bgcolor="#ccffcc"
| 50 || February 18 || Atlanta || W 85–73 || Rodney Rogers (24) || Tied (9) || Jason Kidd (9) || America West Arena  19,023 || 31–19 || 
|-  align="center" bgcolor="#ccffcc"
| 51 || February 21 || @ San Antonio || W 98–89 || Rodney Rogers (22) || Tom Gugliotta (11) || Jason Kidd (11) || Alamodome  17,049 || 32–19 || 
|-  align="center" bgcolor="#ccffcc"
| 52 || February 22 || Denver || W 86–67 || Rodney Rogers (17) || Penny Hardaway (10) || Jason Kidd (7) || America West Arena  19,023 || 33–19 || 
|-  align="center" bgcolor="#ccffcc"
| 53 || February 24 || @ Washington || W 92–83 || Tom Gugliotta (20) || Tom Gugliotta (8) || Jason Kidd (9) || MCI Center  15,191 || 34–19 || 
|-  align="center" bgcolor="#ffcccc"
| 54 || February 25 || @ New York || L 79–84 || Tom Gugliotta (16) || Jason Kidd (10) || Jason Kidd (13) || Madison Square Garden  19,763 || 34–20 || 
|-  align="center" bgcolor="#ffcccc"
| 55 || February 27 || @ Toronto || L 102–103 || Tied (28) || Tom Gugliotta (7) || Penny Hardaway (5) || Air Canada Centre  19,800 || 34–21 || 
|-  align="center" bgcolor="#ccffcc"
| 56 || February 29 || @ Cleveland || W 100–93 || Penny Hardaway (22) || Jason Kidd (9) || Tied (6) || Gund Arena  13,044 || 35–21 || 
|-

|-  align="center" bgcolor="#ccffcc"
| 57 || March 2 || Indiana || W 118–87 || Clifford Robinson (22) || Jason Kidd (9) || Jason Kidd (15) || America West Arena  19,023 || 36–21 || 
|-  align="center" bgcolor="#ccffcc"
| 58 || March 4 || Dallas || W 110–96 || Rodney Rogers (29) || Tom Gugliotta (14) || Jason Kidd (14) || America West Arena  19,023 || 37–21 || 
|-  align="center" bgcolor="#ccffcc"
| 59 || March 6 || Miami || W 100–92 || Penny Hardaway (28) || Jason Kidd (9) || Jason Kidd (17) || America West Arena  19,023 || 38–21 || 
|-  align="center" bgcolor="#ccffcc"
| 60 || March 7 || @ Houston || W 108–101 || Penny Hardaway (24) || Jason Kidd (12) || Penny Hardaway (10) || The Summit  14,749 || 39–21 || 
|-  align="center" bgcolor="#ffcccc"
| 61 || March 10 || Utah || L 96–99 || Penny Hardaway (28) || Luc Longley (7) || Penny Hardaway (12) || America West Arena  19,023 || 39–22 || 
|-  align="center" bgcolor="#ffcccc"
| 62 || March 11 || @ Dallas || L 99–104 || Clifford Robinson (29) || Rodney Rogers (11) || Jason Kidd (9) || Reunion Arena  18,187 || 39–23 || 
|-  align="center" bgcolor="#ccffcc"
| 63 || March 14 || Minnesota || W 107–100 || Penny Hardaway (26) || Shawn Marion (12) || Jason Kidd (12) || America West Arena  19,023 || 40–23 || 
|-  align="center" bgcolor="#ccffcc"
| 64 || March 17 || @ Vancouver || W 101–86 || Clifford Robinson (27) || Shawn Marion (11) || Jason Kidd (15) || General Motors Place  14,255 || 41–23 || 
|-  align="center" bgcolor="#ccffcc"
| 65 || March 19 || @ Golden State || W 99–82 || Clifford Robinson (25) || Shawn Marion (13) || Jason Kidd (14) || The Arena in Oakland  12,837 || 42–23 || 
|-  align="center" bgcolor="#ccffcc"
| 66 || March 19 || Boston || W 110–106 || Clifford Robinson (22) || Tied (9) || Jason Kidd (11) || America West Arena  19,023 || 43–23 || 
|-  align="center" bgcolor="#ccffcc"
| 67 || March 22 || Sacramento || W 114–93 || Clifford Robinson (26) || Shawn Marion (9) || Jason Kidd (7) || America West Arena  19,023 || 44–23 || 
|-  align="center" bgcolor="#ffcccc"
| 68 || March 24 || @ L.A. Lakers || L 101–109 || Penny Hardaway (25) || Shawn Marion (14) || Penny Hardaway (7) || Staples Center  18,997 || 44–24 || 
|-  align="center" bgcolor="#ccffcc"
| 69 || March 26 || Golden State || W 90–82 || Penny Hardaway (33) || Shawn Marion (14) || Randy Livingston (7) || America West Arena  19,023 || 45–24 || 
|-  align="center" bgcolor="#ffcccc"
| 70 || March 28 || @ Miami || L 78–81 || Rodney Rogers (22) || Penny Hardaway (9) || Penny Hardaway (5) || American Airlines Arena  15,923 || 45–25 || 
|-  align="center" bgcolor="#ccffcc"
| 71 || March 30 || @ Atlanta || W 118–74 || Rodney Rogers (21) || Rodney Rogers (8) || Penny Hardaway (11) || Philips Arena  11,870 || 46–25 || 
|-  align="center" bgcolor="#ccffcc"
| 72 || March 31 || @ Detroit || W 98–97 || Clifford Robinson (20) || Tied (8) || Penny Hardaway (12) || The Palace of Auburn Hills  22,076 || 47–25 || 
|-

|-  align="center" bgcolor="#ccffcc"
| 73 || April 2 || @ Minnesota || W 87–86 || Rodney Rogers (23) || Shawn Marion (9) || Penny Hardaway (9) || Target Center  19,006 || 48–25 || 
|-  align="center" bgcolor="#ffcccc"
| 74 || April 4 || L.A. Lakers || L 83–84 || Penny Hardaway (23) || Penny Hardaway (10) || Tied (6) || America West Arena  19,023 || 48–26 || 
|-  align="center" bgcolor="#ffcccc"
| 75 || April 6 || @ Utah || L 85–105 || Penny Hardaway (13) || Penny Hardaway (8) || Kevin Johnson (5) || Delta Center  19,911 || 48–27 || 
|-  align="center" bgcolor="#ccffcc"
| 76 || April 9 || @ Sacramento || W 102–97 || Penny Hardaway (25) || Penny Hardaway (12) || Kevin Johnson (9) || ARCO Arena  17,317 || 49–27 || 
|-  align="center" bgcolor="#ccffcc"
| 77 || April 11 || @ L.A. Clippers || W 95–88 || Clifford Robinson (22) || Shawn Marion (12) || Penny Hardaway (8) || Staples Center  14,724 || 50–27 || 
|-  align="center" bgcolor="#ccffcc"
| 78 || April 12 || Vancouver || W 122–116 (OT) || Clifford Robinson (36) || Clifford Robinson (10) || Randy Livingston (7) || America West Arena  18,463 || 51–27 || 
|-  align="center" bgcolor="#ccffcc"
| 79 || April 14 || L.A. Clippers || W 112–88 || Rodney Rogers (22) || Tied (11) || Penny Hardaway (8) || America West Arena  18,538 || 52–27 || 
|-  align="center" bgcolor="#ffcccc"
| 80 || April 16 || Utah || L 82–96 || Penny Hardaway (16) || Oliver Miller (8) || Randy Livingston (7) || America West Arena  19,023 || 52–28 || 
|-  align="center" bgcolor="#ffcccc"
| 81 || April 18 || Houston || L 98–107 || Tied (20) || Penny Hardaway (10) || Penny Hardaway (12) || America West Arena  19,023 || 52–29 || 
|-  align="center" bgcolor="#ccffcc"
| 82 || April 19 || @ Golden State || W 99–88 || Clifford Robinson (23) || Tied (8) || Tied (5) || The Arena in Oakland  14,212 || 53–29 || 
|-

Playoffs 

|-  align="center" bgcolor="#ccffcc"
| 1 || April 22 || @ San Antonio || W 72–70 || Tied (17) || Shawn Marion (9) || Kevin Johnson (basketball) (6) || Alamodome  21,916 || 1–0 || 
|-  align="center" bgcolor="#ffcccc"
| 2 || April 25 || @ San Antonio || L 70–85 || Penny Hardaway (19) || Corie Blount (11) || Tied (3) || Alamodome  20,617 || 1–1 || 
|-  align="center" bgcolor="#ccffcc"
| 3 || April 29 || San Antonio || W 101–94 || Penny Hardaway (17) || Shawn Marion (14) || Penny Hardaway (13) || America West Arena  19,023 || 2–1 || 
|-  align="center" bgcolor="#ccffcc"
| 4 || May 2 || San Antonio || W 89–78 || Tied (23) || Tied (10) || Jason Kidd (10) || America West Arena  19,023 || 3–1 || 
|-

|-  align="center" bgcolor="#ffcccc"
| 1 || May 7 || @ L.A. Lakers || L 77–105 || Penny Hardaway (25) || Tied (7) || Jason Kidd (7) || Staples Center  18,997 || 0–1 || 
|-  align="center" bgcolor="#ffcccc"
| 2 || May 10 || @ L.A. Lakers || L 96–97 || Clifford Robinson (30) || Tied (9) || Penny Hardaway (8) || Staples Center  18,997 || 0–2 || 
|-  align="center" bgcolor="#ffcccc"
| 3 || May 12 || L.A. Lakers || L 99–105 || Penny Hardaway (31) || Clifford Robinson (9) || Jason Kidd (12) || America West Arena  19,023 || 0–3 || 
|-  align="center" bgcolor="#ccffcc"
| 4 || May 14 || L.A. Lakers || W 117–98 || Clifford Robinson (32) || Jason Kidd (10) || Jason Kidd (16) || America West Arena  19,023 || 1–3 || 
|-  align="center" bgcolor="#ffcccc"
| 5 || May 16 || @ L.A. Lakers || L 65–87 || Todd Day (10) || Rodney Rogers (8) || Clifford Robinson (4) || Staples Center  18,997 || 1–4 || 
|-

Awards and honors

Week/Month
 Jason Kidd was named Player of the Week for games played December 12 through December 18.

All-Star
 Jason Kidd was voted as a starter for the Western Conference in the All-Star Game. Kidd finished first in voting among Western Conference guards with 1,061,031 votes.

Season
 Rodney Rogers received the Sixth Man of the Year Award. Rogers also finished eighth in Most Improved Player voting.
 Jason Kidd was named to the All-NBA First Team. Kidd also finished tenth in MVP voting.
 Jason Kidd was named to the NBA All-Defensive Second Team. Kidd also finished tenth in Defensive Player of the Year voting.
 Clifford Robinson was named to the NBA All-Defensive Second Team. Robinson also finished tenth in Defensive Player of the Year voting.
 Shawn Marion was named to the NBA All-Rookie Second Team.
 Jason Kidd led the league in assists per game with a 10.1 average.

Player statistics

Season

† – Minimum 300 field goals made.
^ – Minimum 55 three-pointers made.
# – Minimum 125 free throws made.

Playoffs

† – Minimum 20 field goals made.
^ – Minimum 10 free throws made.

Transactions

Trades

Free agents

Additions

Subtractions

Player Transactions Citation:

References

External links
 Standings on Basketball Reference

Phoenix Suns seasons
Phoenix